Phyllosticta cyclaminella is a fungal plant pathogen infecting cyclamens.

References

External links
 Index Fungorum
 USDA ARS Fungal Database

Fungal plant pathogens and diseases
Ornamental plant pathogens and diseases
cyclaminella